Edward Frederick Crippin (17 May 1848 – 3 February 1892) was an English businessman.

Crippin was born at 13 Tonman Street, Manchester, Lancashire. His father William Crippin (1815–1879) was a coal agent and his mother Sarah Crippin (née Brettargh) (1815–1874) was a housewife.  He eventually took over his father's business, Bryn Hall Colliery, Bryn, Ashton-in-Makerfield, near Wigan. Crippen was a successful businessman who never married.

On 22 August 1890 in Wigan, Crippen was involved in what The Wigan Observer And District Advertiser described as an "Exciting Scene in Wallgate":

"About noon yesterday (Friday), an exciting scene was witnessed in Wallgate, near the end of Queen-street. A girl named Ellen Moore, 13 years of age, of 54, Clayton-street, Wigan, was crossing the road, carrying a child two years of age, when she was knocked down by a hansom cab owned by Mr. Crippin, Bryn. The girl's attention was evidently attracted by something coming up Wallgate, for she did not appear to hear the cries of the driver of the cab, and before he could stop his horse the girl was knocked down and the wheels of the vehicle had passed over her legs. The baby was in great danger, and the spectators shrieked as they saw it down and the vehicle advancing. Fortunately Police-constable Wilkinson was at hand, and by his presence of mind and prompt action the child's life was saved. Springing forward he seized the horse and stopped it, just as the wheel of the cab was about to pass over the child's neck. Mr. Crippin was in the cab going to the London and North-Western Station, and he alighted and told the officer to get a doctor and he would pay the expense. When he had gone to the station, Mr. Crippin sent his cab back to take the girl and child home. The girl was taken to the surgeries of Dr. Berry and Dr. Bradbury, but they were not in, and they were removed home and attended by Dr. Timothy. No bones were broken, but the girl's left knee was badly injured, and the child's forehead was hurt. The cab was driven by Bernard Doodge, but he was in no way to blame for the accident."

Bryn Hall at Ashton in Makerfield was the Crippin family home while they ran the colliery. Edward Crippen lived at Bryn Hall until the 1890 incident after which he was frowned on by local residents. As a result he moved to Bank Hall, Bretherton and travelled to Ashton in Makerfield to run his business.

Crippin's memorial at Manchester Crematorium gives his address at the time of death as Bryn Hall where he lived at the time of the 1881 census. The 1891 census shows he moved to Bank Hall, Bretherton where he died of pneumonia on 3 February 1892 aged 44. His cremation took place at Woking Crematorium, Surrey.

References

1848 births
1892 deaths
Bank Hall
19th-century English businesspeople
Businesspeople from Manchester
Deaths from pneumonia in England